10 and Under Tennis is a program that was introduced by the United States Tennis Association (USTA) in the summer of 2010. Upon making the change official in 2012, it modified the format of all USTA and International Tennis Federation (ITF) events involving players of years 10 and younger. The program changes the game making it easier for children to succeed. The objective is to adapt the court, balls, racket, and net to the size and strength level of youth players. These alternations create the opportunity for younger players to spend more time hitting balls rather than chasing them. It allows them to hone tennis skills and accelerate their development. The hope is that earlier success in tennis will translate to a lifetime of interest in the sport and perhaps set a foundation for generations of more world-class players.

Under the changes made through 10 and Under Tennis, not only are court dimensions smaller, racket shorter, and tennis nets lower but the balls used are larger and have less compression. With a lower compression, balls don't bounce as high. This keeps them within a younger players strike zone creating more chances to make contact with the ball.

The unique coloring of the balls provides better visual indication of the spin that both that the player and his/her opponent are able to put on the ball. A large part of developing a strong tennis stroke is being able to generate the necessary ball rotation required in each situation. The colorized ball provides immediate feedback, letting the young players know if they executed their stroke properly.

As young players progress in age and ability, the size of the court and balls change as well. The player's progression through the levels of the 10 and Under Tennis program supports an easier transition to the standard adult game. By the time players evolve to the traditional ball and court dimensions, they will have had more chances to master the nuances of the game than players taking more conventional developmental approaches using standard balls, court sizes, and instruction.

Red Stage 1 (ages 4-6) 

Red stage 1 is for ages four to six.

Ball:
 Color: Red & Yellow
 Material: Foam 
 Size: larger than felt red ball
 Compression: n/a
Racket:
 Size: 23 inches or less
Court:
 Singles Dimensions: 36 feet by 18 feet
 Doubles Dimension: n/a
Net:
 Height: 2 feet 9 inches
Scoring:
 Best of 3 games.  7 points per game.  First to 7 wins the game.
 1 set to 6 games (lead by 2) with a 9-point tie-break at 6–6. Every game starts at 30-30 (https://thirty30tennis.com)
Goals:
 Developing basic athletic skills as well as eye / hand coordination.

Red Stage 2 (ages 6-8) 

Red stage 2 is for ages six to eight.

Ball:
 Color: Red & Yellow
 Material: Felt 
 Size: 15% larger than standard yellow balls
 Compression: 25% compression of yellow balls
Racket:
 Size: 23 inches or less

Court:
 Singles Dimensions: 36 feet by 18 feet
 Doubles Dimension: n/a
Net:
 Height: 2 feet 9 inches
Scoring:
 Best of 3 games. 7 points per game.  First to 7 wins the game.
 1 set to 6 games (lead by 2) with a 9-point tie-break at 6–6. Every game starts at 30-30 (https://thirty30tennis.com)
Goals:
 Developing basic athletic, racquet, and tennis game skills.

Orange (ages 7-10) 

Orange stage is for ages seven to ten.

Ball:
 Color: Orange & Yellow
 Material: Felt 
 Size: standard size
 Compression: 50% compression of yellow balls
Racket:
 Size: 23-25 inches
Court:
 Singles Dimensions: 60 feet by 21 feet
 Doubles Dimension: 60 feet by 27 feet
Net:
 Height: 3 feet at center, 3 feet 6 inches at posts
Scoring:
 Best of 3 sets.  The first to win 4 games wins the set.  In the third set, the first player to win 7 points wins the set.
 1 set to 6 games (lead by 2) with a 9-point tie-break at 6–6. Every game starts at 30-30 (https://thirty30tennis.com)
Goals:
 Developing tennis athletic, technical, and competitive skills.

Green (ages 11-12) 

Green stage is for ages eleven to twelve.

Ball:
 Color: Green & Yellow
 Material: Felt 
 Size: standard size
 Compression: 75% compression of yellow balls
Racket:
 Size: 25-27 inches

Court:
 Singles Dimensions: 78 feet by 27 feet
 Doubles Dimension: 78 feet by 36 feet
Net:
 Height: 3 feet at center, 3 feet 6 inches at posts
Scoring:
 Best of 3 games.  7 points per game, first to 7 wins the game.
 1 set to 6 games (lead by 2) with a 9-point tie-break at 6–6. Every game starts at 30-30 (https://thirty30tennis.com)
Goals:
 Bring together tennis technical, tactical, and physical skills during competition.

References

External links 
 Official 10 and Under Tennis website
 Official United States Tennis Association website
 Official International Tennis Federation website

Video(s) 
Video explaining 10 and under tennis balls
Video explaining 10 and under tennis court sizes

United States, Ten and under
Tennis leagues in the United States
Youth sport in the United States